The Ministry of Defence and Armed Forces Logistics (MODAFL) is the defence ministry of the Islamic Republic of Iran and part of the country's executive branch. It thus reports to the President of Iran, not to the Commander-in-Chief of the Iranian Armed Forces. 

Unlike many countries, the ministry is not involved with in-the-field military operational command of the armed forces. Instead it is responsible for planning, logistics and funding of the Armed Forces of the Islamic Republic of Iran while the General Staff, a separate institution under command of the supreme leader of Iran, has control over the forces. The MODAFL is also the major player in defense industry of Iran, with multiple conglomerates and subordinates active in research and development, maintenance and manufacturing of military equipment. It annually exports military equipment manufactured in Iran to forces of countries such as Syria, Iraq, Venezuela and Sudan (the latter ceased in 2019), as well as non-state actors like Hezbollah.

The ministry is considered one of the three "sovereign" ministerial bodies of Iran due to nature of its work at home and abroad.

History

1952–53: Reforms under Mossadegh 
When Mohammad Mossadegh took over the ministry on 21 July 1952, he initiated a series of reforms in the ministry. He named general Ahmad Vossough as his deputy and renamed the ministry from 'War' to 'National Defense', cut the military budget by 15% and vowed to only purchase defensive military equipment. Two investigatory commissions were formed, one for examining previous promotions and the other for materiel procurement. Under Mossadegh, some 15,000 personnel were transferred from the army to the gendarmerie and 136 officers, including 15 general officers, were purged.

1970s procurement

1982–89: Two ministries 

The Islamic Revolutionary Guard Corps had between 1982 and 1989 its own dedicated defence ministry, mirroring the existing ministry of defence which solely supplied the Islamic Republic of Iran Army during this period. Under President Akbar Hashemi Rafsanjani in 1989, the two ministries were merged into one in order to cease parallel work and reduce interservice rivalry.

Subordinates

Iranian military industry, under the command of Ministry of Defence, is composed of the following main components:

In August 2018, the Iranian Ministry of Defense declared it had unloaded its shares in Wagon Pars and Iran Airtour. In November 2020, the head of the Research and Innovation Organisation of the defence ministry, the nuclear physicist Mohsen Fakhrizadeh, was assassinated in an ambush near Tehran.

Ministers of Defence since 1979

|-
! colspan="8" align="center" | Minister of National Defence

|-
! colspan="8" align="center" | Minister of Defence

|-
! colspan="8" align="center" | Minister of Defence and Armed Forces Logistics

See also 
 Islamic Republic of Iran Mine Action Center (2003)
 Military budget of Iran

References 

Ministry of Defense and Armed Forces Logistics (MODAFL)
Anthony H. Cordesman, Iran's military forces in transition

External links

1989 establishments in Iran
Defence
Iran
Iran, Defence
Military of Iran
Ministry of Defence and Armed Forces Logistics of the Islamic Republic of Iran